U.S. Route 49W (US 49W) is an  U.S. Highway in the Delta region of Mississippi, passing through Yazoo, Humphreys, Sunflower, and Tallahatchie counties.

Route description

US 49W begins just north of downtown Yazoo City at an interchange between US 49 and US 49E. It heads northwest to have an interchange with and become concurrent with MS 3 before leaving Yazoo City and crossing over the Yazoo River. The highway then crosses into Humphreys County just southwest of Carter.

US 49W/MS 3 now cross over the Will M. Whittington Auxiliary Channel and Lake Atchaflya before passing through Silver City and having an intersection with MS 149. The highway continues north, paralleling the Yazoo River, to pass through Belzoni, where it bypasses downtown along its west side and has a short concurrency with MS 12 and an intersection with MS 7. US 49W/MS 3 continue northwest to pass through Isola, where it has an intersection with unsigned MS 806 (Belzoni Street) and crosses over Lake Dawson, before entering Sunflower County.

The highway passes through Caile and Inverness, where it intersects another section of MS 149, before MS 3 splits off towards Moorhead near Baird. US 49W crosses over the Sunflower River to enter Indianola. It bypasses downtown along its east side, passing through neighborhoods to have an intersection with US 82. The highway then narrows to two-lanes to leave Indianola and cross the Sunflower River for a second time. Prior to this point, the entire route of US 49W is a four-lane highway. US 49W passes through Sunflower, where it intersects unsigned MS 810 and rejoins MS 3, before passing through Dwyer and Blaine. US 49W/MS 3 passes through Doddsville, where it has a short concurrency with MS 442 and intersects unsigned MS 832, and Cottondale before passing through Ruleville, where it has an intersection with unsigned MS 812 and MS 8. The highway passes through Drew, where it intersects unsigned MS 820, before passing by the Mississippi State Penitentiary, where it has an intersection with MS 32. US 49W/MS 3 passes through Rome before cutting a corner of  Coahoma County. Soon after, the route reaches Tallahatchie County.

The highway passes northeast through rural areas for several miles before entering Tutwiler and coming to an end at a Y-Intersection between US 49 and US 49E, with MS 3 continuing north along US 49.

History

U.S. Route 49W didn't come about until 1932, when the US 49 split was made. The southern section of this route was designated for 4-laning under the 1987 Highway Program, and was also marked as NHS.

The highway previously traveled straight through downtown Yazoo City along what is now MS 149/MS 16 (Broadway Street). No trucks were allowed along this portion of the highway, with trucks forced to detour via routes on the edge of the city. In 2004, a completely new four-lane alignment between Yazoo City and Silver City opened. This had the effect of lengthening US 49, shortening US 49W, and allowing trucks to follow US 49W without detouring around the middle of Yazoo City. The former two-lane alignment of US 49W between Yazoo City and Silver City became part of MS 149 in 2006.

It is notable that for several years during the 1930s, a second split route existed on US 49 in South Mississippi, similar to but shorter than the split that still exists in the Delta region.  Between Brooklyn and Hattiesburg, travelers had the option of a  direct route via US 49W, or a somewhat shorter but broken route on US 49E, serving the Forrest County Agricultural High School and the small community of McLaurin, Mississippi.

Major intersections

See also

References

External links

W
49W
49W
Transportation in Yazoo County, Mississippi
Transportation in Humphreys County, Mississippi
Transportation in Sunflower County, Mississippi
Transportation in Tallahatchie County, Mississippi